International Wrestling Revolution Group (Grupo Internacional Revolución in Spanish; the Spanish name is used for the promotion while the English initials are used for the title governing body) is a Lucha Libre promotion based in Naucalpan, State of Mexico, Mexico. Founded in 1996 by Adolfo Moreno and since Moreno's death in late 2007 has been controlled by his sons Alfredo and Marco Moreno.

IWRG has its own championships but like many Mexican promotions recognize champions from other promotions, occasionally allowing them to defend those titles on IWRG shows. In recent times the company has become a more direct competitor to Consejo Mundial de Lucha Libre (CMLL) and Asistencia Asesoria y Administracion (AAA), acquiring a national television deal with TV Azteca and using a number of talent that have left CMLL or AAA to bolster their ranks and profile. IWRG's home base is Arena Naucalpan where the majority of their shows are held, though they have regularly promoted shows at other venues such as Arena Emiliano Zapata, Arena Xochimilco and Arena Neza.

History
Wrestler-turned-promoter Adolfo "Pirata" Moreno began promoting wrestling shows in his native Naucalpan de Juárez, Mexico, bringing in wrestlers from Empresa Mexicana de Lucha Libre (EMLL) to Naucalpan as well as featuring wrestlers from the Mexican independent circuit. Later on he would promote shows mainly in "Arena KO Al Gusto" and served as the Universal Wrestling Association (UWA) partner, using the name Promociones Moreno as the business name for his promotional efforts. In 1977 Moreno bought the run down Arena KO Al Gusto and had Arena Naucalpan built in its place, an arena designed specifically for wrestling shows, with a maximum capacity of 2,400 spectators for the shows. Arena Naucalpan became the permanent home for Promociones Moreno, with very few shows held elsewhere. In the 1990s the UWA folded and Promociones Moreno worked primarily with EMLL, now rebranded as Consejo Mundial de Lucha Libre (CMLL). From the mid-1990s Moreno would promote several Naucalpan championships, including the Naucalpan Tag Team Championship, Naucalpan Middleweight Championship and the Naucalpan Welterweight Championship, all sanctioned by the local boxing and wrestling commission.

In late 1995 Adolfo Moreno decided to create his own promotion, creating a regular roster instead of relying totally on wrestlers from other promotions, creating the International Wrestling Revolution Group (IWRG; sometimes referred to as Grupo Internacional Revolución in Spanish) on January 1, 1996. From that point on Arena Naucalpan became the main venue for IWRG, hosting the majority of their weekly shows and all of their major shows as well. With the creation of the IWRG Moreno abandoned the Naucalpan championships, instead introducing a series of IWRG branded championships, starting with the IWRG Intercontinental Middleweight Championship created on July 27, 1997, followed by the IWRG Intercontinental Heavyweight Championship two months later. IWRG also kept promoting the Distrito Federal Trios Championship, the only championship predating the foundation of the IWRG. In 2007 Adolfo Moreno died, leaving his sons César and Marco Moreno to take ownership of both International Wrestling Revolution Group as well as Arena Naucalpan.

Working with other promotions
IWRG often works together with other wrestling promotions, booking their wrestlers on IWRG shows and sending IWRG wrestlers to work for the other promotions. They also co-promote events, recognize non-IWRG championships and at times allow them to be defended on IWRG shows.

Último Dragón Gym/Toryumon Mexico 

IWRG was affiliated with Último Dragón and Toryumon Mexico (Ultimo Dragon Gym) from the time of IWRG's creation until 2001. The early Toryumon Mexico shows were co-promoted by IWRG and Último Dragón in Naucalpan and students regularly worked on IWRG s shows. CIMA, SUWA, Yasushi Kanda, Susumu Mochizuki and Magnum Tokyo have all held IWRG championships through the working relationship.

Consejo Mundial de Lucha Libre 

IWRG developed a talent agreement with Consejo Mundial de Lucha Libre (CMLL) in the early 2000s, which allowed them to use CMLL talent regularly, as well as being used by CMLL as a sort of developmental territory for young wrestlers. The two promotions had a falling out in late 2007, over IWRG booking El Hijo del Santo on their shows, in disregard of CMLL having stated that did not want any of their associates to use Hijo del Santo on their shows.

Asistencia Asesoría y Administración 

During a show on April 29, 2010 Asistencia Asesoría y Administración (AAA) wrestler Silver King showed up for the show, allegedly to promote a movie, to signal the beginning of IWRG and AAA working together for the first time.

Pro Wrestling Noah 

On December 5, 2019, it was announced that IWRG and Pro Wrestling Noah had entered into a talent-sharing partnership.

Roster 
Like many promotions on the Mexican independent circuit IWRG does not generally have wrestlers under exclusive full-time contracts and often works with a number of wrestlers on a "per appearance" basis. IWRG does employ a core group of wrestlers on a regular basis but does not have an official "roster" as such.

Major shows
Each year IWRG promotes a number of signature events, some shown on television and others only for the people in attendance. The major shows, shown in order of when they happen during the year, include:

Championships
Active championships

Inactive IWRG championships

Tournaments
IWRG conducts several annual tournaments which usually signify a big push. Some tournaments have been left off the schedule some years for unexplained reasons, others have been held several times in a year

Active tournaments

Past tournaments
These are tournaments that have been held in the past by IWRG but have not been promoted in the last two years.

See also

List of professional wrestling promotions in Mexico

References

External links
 IWRG official website

 
1996 establishments in Mexico
Mexican professional wrestling promotions
Lucha libre